Alleghany County Public Schools is a public school system which serves Alleghany County, Virginia of the lower Shenandoah Valley. 

The system consists of approximately 2,172 students across five schools, of which there are three elementary schools, one middle schools, and one high school.  According to the system's six year comprehensive plan, enrollment is projected to decline to 1,621 students by the 2020–2021 school year. The school system's headquarters is located in Low Moor, Virginia.

Schools

Secondary schools
Alleghany High School, Covington 
Clifton Middle School, Covington

Elementary schools
All elementary schools hold students in grades K-5.
Callaghan Elementary School, Covington
Mountain View Elementary School, Covington
Sharon Elementary School, Clifton Forge

Former Schools
Two elementary schools closed after the 2012–2013 school year due to declining enrollment.
Boiling Spring Elementary School, Covington
Falling Spring Elementary School, Hot Springs

References

External links
 

School divisions in Virginia
Education in Alleghany County, Virginia